Laser Focus World is a monthly magazine published by Endeavor Business Media covering laser, photonics and optoelectronics technologies, applications, and markets. Many qualified professionals in those fields receive it free of charge; it is also possible to subscribe to the magazine.

History and profile
Laser Focus World has been published since 1965. It is published on a monthly basis and owned by Endeavor Business Media. The headquarters of the magazine is in Nashua, New Hampshire. Approximately 80,000 qualified subscribers receive the publication and can track daily photonics news and read original features at the magazine's website. There is also an annual buyer's guide.

The magazine is the recipient of the 2011 Folio Awards.

Notes

External links
Laser Focus World website.

1965 establishments in Oklahoma
Business magazines published in the United States
Monthly magazines published in the United States
Laser awards and associations
Magazines established in 1965
Magazines published in Oklahoma
Mass media in Tulsa, Oklahoma
Science and technology magazines published in the United States